Vitorino José Carneiro Monteiro, Baron of São Borja was a Brazilian Lieutenant General of the Paraguayan War. He was one of the primary commanders at the Battle of Tuyutí and had an extensive career during the 19th century.

Biography
He was the son of Major João Francisco Carneiro Monteiro and Isabel Rosa Ramos. On February 2, 1842, he married Benevenuta Amália Ribeiro, daughter of Marshal Bento Manuel Ribeiro and Maria Manso da Conceição.

While still a student, he marched to the wars of Panelas, Miranda and Jacuípe, in Pernambuco where he was seriously wounded and discharged in 1833. As an amanuensis for the Recife police in 1836, he fought in Rio Grande do Sul during the Ragamuffin War in 1837, being promoted to Major. He also campaigned in Uruguay in 1854, being promoted to commander of the first brigade and promoted to Lieutenant Colonel. During the Paraguayan War, he was promoted to Brigadier General.

He participated in many engagements, notably the Battle of Tuyutí on May 24, 1866 where he commanded the 6th Brigade but was wounded and was brevetted Marshal for his acts of bravery. He was commander of the arms of Pernambuco in 1870 and of Rio Grande do Sul in 1871. In 1877, he was promoted to lieutenant general.

As a fidalgo, he was a recipient of the Knight of Order of the Rose, Commander of the Imperial Order of Aviz, and received the medals of merit and military bravery.

He was the grandfather of feminist leader Nuta James.

References

1816 births
1877 deaths
Brazilian generals
Brazilian military personnel of the Paraguayan War
People from Recife
Brazilian nobility